The 2003 Croatia Open was a tennis tournament played on outdoor clay courts at the ITC Stella Maris in Umag in Croatia and was part of the International Series of the 2003 ATP Tour. The tournament ran from 21 July through 27 July 2003.

Finals

Singles

 Carlos Moyá defeated  Filippo Volandri 6–4, 3–6, 7–5
 It was Moyá's 3rd title of the year and the 14th of his career.

Doubles

 Álex López Morón /  Rafael Nadal defeated  Todd Perry /  Thomas Shimada 6–1, 6–3
 It was López Morón's only title of the year and the 2nd of his career. It was Nadal's only title of the year and the 1st of his career.

References

External links
 Official website 
 ITF tournament edition details
 ATP tournament profile

Croatia Open
Croatia Open
2002 in Croatian tennis